Insolent may refer to:

, the name of several ships
Insolent (album), by RK, 1984

See also